James Kelly Parsons (February 11, 1877 – November 8, 1960) was a career officer in the United States Army. He attained the rank of major general, and was notable for his command of the 39th Infantry Regiment in France during World War I, and his post-war command of the Army's tank school, 23rd Infantry Brigade, 5th Infantry Brigade, and 2nd Infantry Division. He closed his career as commander of Third Corps Area and interim commander of the First United States Army, positions in which he supervised training exercises designed to prepare units for overseas service as the Army began to expand at the start of World War II.

Early life
James Kelly Parsons was born in Rockford, Alabama on February 11, 1877. He was the son of Catherine "Kate" (Kelly) Parsons and Lewis E. Parsons (1846–1916), a lawyer who served as United States Attorney for the Northern District of Alabama.

Parsons' grandfather, also named Lewis E. Parsons (1817–1895), was provisional Governor of Alabama after the American Civil War, and was elected to the United States Senate during the Reconstruction Era, but was not allowed to take his seat because Alabama had not yet attained full readmission to the Union.

Parsons attended the schools of Birmingham, Alabama and graduated from Paul Hayne School and the Taylor School. He then began the study of law under Birmingham attorney William Columbus Ward. In 1898 he was commissioned for the Spanish–American War as a first lieutenant in the 3rd Alabama Volunteer Infantry, a unit of African American soldiers and white officers. His regimental commander was Robert Lee Bullard, and Parsons' connection to Bullard helped Parsons receive a commission in the regular army and continue his military career.

Early career
Parsons remained in the United States Army after the war with Spain, receiving his commission as a second lieutenant in the 20th Infantry in 1899. He served in the Philippine Insurrection until 1901, when he was promoted to first lieutenant in the 28th Infantry, and later that year transferred back to the 20th Infantry. He graduated from the Infantry and Cavalry School in 1904. In 1908 he received promotion to captain, and his assignments at this rank included command of Company F, 20th Infantry Regiment in Hawaii. He was promoted to major in 1917.

In the years before World War I Parsons served as mustering officer at Camp Glenn near Morehead City, North Carolina, and then as an observer and advisor with the New York National Guard.

World War I
At the start of World War I Parsons was promoted to temporary lieutenant colonel and then temporary colonel, and assigned to the staff of the American Expeditionary Forces in France. He later served as commander of the 39th Infantry Regiment, 4th Infantry Division. He was gassed during a German attack on October 11, 1918, and was relieved by Troy H. Middleton. In 1919 Parsons received the Distinguished Service Cross for heroism as commander of the 39th Infantry. The citation for his DSC reads:

In addition, he received the Army Distinguished Service Medal for his post-war command of the Embarkation Center at Saint-Nazaire, which processed American service members for their post-war return trips to the United States. His DSM citation reads:

Parsons also received the Purple Heart for wounds received while in command of the 39th Regiment.

Interbellum
After the war Parsons returned to his permanent rank of major. He was promoted to permanent lieutenant colonel in 1920 and permanent colonel in 1923. His assignments included again serving as inspector and advisor for the New York National Guard, and serving on a board to recommend armory locations, training sites, and unit types and sizes for the Indiana National Guard. Parsons graduated from the United States Army Command and General Staff College in 1923, the United States Army War College in 1924, and the Naval War College in 1925. He received promotion to brigadier general in 1930 and major general in 1936.

In 1930 and 1931 Parsons commanded the 9th Coast Artillery District in San Francisco. He was commander of the 23rd Infantry Brigade at Fort William McKinley, Philippines from 1931 to 1933, and the 5th Infantry Brigade at Vancouver Barracks, Washington from 1933 to 1936.

Advocate of integration
In the 1920s Parsons was recognized as a proponent of racial integration, in contrast to most of his professional colleagues. In 1924 the Army War College surveyed commissioned officers about whether and how to integrate Army units. At the time, African Americans served in segregated units, usually under white officers. Based on his experience in the Spanish–American War and his observations of African American soldiers during World War I, Parsons argued for desegregating army units and having each one incorporate a set percentage of black soldiers. In his view, black soldiers could be expected to perform capably if given the same training as whites, and incorporating them into units with whites would prevent them from being singled out for inferior duties like kitchen patrol and the loading and unloading of cargo. Parsons was convinced that African Americans could also serve as officers, although his point of view was that they would not be able to lead white soldiers effectively due to the prejudice of the times, but could instead aspire to command positions in the transportation and supply units that often contained large numbers of black soldiers in wartime. The army did not agree with Parsons' recommendations, and continued to allow African Americans to serve only in segregated units, and with few opportunities for assignment to leadership positions.

Advocate of mechanization
Parsons commanded the Army's tank school at Fort Meade, Maryland in 1925, and then again from 1929 to 1930. While at the tank school he developed plans for a mechanized army that were not adopted at the time, but which were similar to the designs for the armor and infantry divisions the United States Army fielded in World War II.

World War II
Parsons commanded the 2nd Infantry Division at Fort Sam Houston, Texas from 1936 to 1938, and from 1938 until 1940 he commanded the Third Corps Area with headquarters in Baltimore, Maryland. In 1938 he also served as interim commander of First United States Army. As corps area commander, Parsons oversaw the planning, execution and evaluation of exercises designed to assess the fitness of units, staffs and commanders as the army expanded and increased readiness at the start World War II.

Development of new field jacket
While in command of Third Corps Area, Parsons oversaw development and fielding of a new field jacket, the M-1941, which was used by the army throughout World War II. Parsons had launched the project after identifying a need to replace the wool coat then in use with an outer garment that was lightweight, water repellent, and windproof, and could incorporate a liner for warmth during the winter.

Retirement
In February 1941 Parsons reached the mandatory retirement age of 64 and concluded his military service.

Parsons died aboard the ship RMS Caronia on November 8, 1960 while in port at Venice, Italy. He was buried at Arlington National Cemetery, Section 1, Site 325-B.

Family
In 1904 Parsons married Volinda Lucy Henderson (1880–1957) in Columbus, Ohio. Volinda Parsons was the daughter of Charles G. Henderson and Ellen Beatty, the granddaughter of Union Army General John Beatty, and a 1904 graduate of Vassar College. James and Volinda Parsons had no children.

References

External links
 

1877 births
1960 deaths
United States Army Infantry Branch personnel
People from Coosa County, Alabama
United States Army generals
United States Army Command and General Staff College alumni
United States Army War College alumni
Naval War College alumni
American military personnel of the Spanish–American War
United States Army personnel of World War I
United States Army personnel of World War II
Recipients of the Distinguished Service Cross (United States)
Recipients of the Distinguished Service Medal (US Army)
Burials at Arlington National Cemetery